Dr. Akhilesh Das Gupta Stadium is a multi-purpose stadium, used mostly for Cricket and Association football, situated in the campus of Babu Banarasi Das University, Lucknow.

Capacity

The Stadium has a capacity to accommodate more than 20,000 spectators. The stadium is approved by BCCI to hold first-class level matches and is regularly used for Ranji Trophy matches every year.

Matches hosted

Following are the Ranji Trophy matches played at the stadium so far:
 Uttar Pradesh cricket team against Baroda cricket team in 2007/08 
 Uttar Pradesh cricket team against Delhi cricket team in 2009/10 
 Uttar Pradesh cricket team against Orissa cricket team in 2010/11 
 Uttar Pradesh cricket team against Mumbai cricket team in 2011/12
 Uttar Pradesh cricket team against Haryana cricket team in 2012/13 
 Uttar Pradesh cricket team against Railways cricket team in 2013/14
 Uttar Pradesh cricket team against Baroda cricket team in 2014/15

IPL

During 2016 Indian Premier League, Mumbai Indians used this stadium to hold practice sessions in preparation for their match against Gujarat Lions at Green Park Stadium.

See also
Akhilesh Das
Babu Banarasi Das University, Lucknow
Uttar Pradesh cricket team
Green Park Stadium
Ranji Trophy

References

External links
Details according to ESPNCricinfo
Details according to CricketArchive
Details according to Cricbuzz

University sports venues in India
Sports venues in Lucknow
Sports venues completed in 2007
2007 establishments in Uttar Pradesh